Peter Faulhammer (died May 2019) also known as Martillo Vago, is a former member of Sash!. Martillo Vago is a transliteration of Faulhammer's last name.

Martillo Vago's hits include "Por què no" and "Que es la vida". Under the name Peter Faulhammer, he is featured alongside Rodriguez in Sash!'s international hit "Adelante" where he is credited with his name Peter Faulhammer.

He inspired another group called Ovni Vago with expected release "Por qué no podéis", which is a metaphor of the desire of the fans.

Discography

Singles
Featured in

References

External links
 Official Website

German electronic musicians
German male singers
Year of birth missing (living people)
Living people